The 1900 municipal election was held December 10, 1900 for the purpose of electing a mayor and three aldermen to sit on the Edmonton Town Council, as well as five public school trustees and four separate school trustees.

There were six aldermanic positions on the council at the time, but three of them were already filled.  Robert Lee and Alfred Brown had both been elected for a two-year term in 1899, and were still in office.  Colin Strang had also been elected for a two-year term, but had resigned; James Blowey had been appointed by council to fill his seat, and he was still in office.

Voter turnout

212 voters voted out of 400 eligible voters, for a turnout of 53.0%.

Results

(bold indicates elected, italics indicate incumbent)

Mayor

Kenneth W. MacKenzie was acclaimed as mayor.

Aldermen

William Thomas Henry - 142
Joseph Morris - 110
Henry Goodridge - 109
Joseph Gariépy
Phillip Heiminck
William Harold Clark
Thomas Bellamy
Hedley C. Taylor

Vote totals defeated candidates for this election are no longer available.
(Vote count exceeded number of voters who voted because each voter could cast up to three votes under the Block Voting system.)

Public school trustees

Thomas Bellamy, Matthew McCauley, William Short, Alex Taylor, and Hedley C. Taylor were elected.  Detailed results are no longer available.

Separate (Catholic) school trustees

Nicolas Dubois Dominic Beck, Joseph Henri Picard, Antonio Prince, and Georges Roy were elected.  Detailed results are no longer available.

References

City of Edmonton: Edmonton Elections

1900
1900 elections in Canada
1900 in Alberta